The Piano Concerto No. 8 in C major, K. 246, or Lützow Concert was written by Wolfgang Amadeus Mozart in April 1776 in the same year as the Haffner Serenade (K. 250). Countess Antonia Lützow, 25 or 26 years old, second wife of Johann Nepomuk Gottfried Graf Lützow, the Commander of the Hohensalzburg Fortress, was a fine pianist. The solo work is not highly demanding, but it requires agility. Mozart played the concerto in Mannheim and Munich on October 4, 1777, and used it for teaching. Three different cadenzas have survived of varying difficulty, accommodating the abilities of performers from student level to professional: one for two pianos.

It is also suggested Mozart wrote a violin concerto for Countess Lützow's brother Johann Rudolph Czernin (and almost the same age as Mozart). Johann Rudolf, his sister and their father were in connection with Mozart at that time, while Mozart was in service of their uncle Count Hieronymus von Colloredo.

Instrumentation

The concerto is scored for two oboes, two horns, solo piano and string section.

Movements
 
The concerto, very convenient for beginning performers, is in three movements:

References

External links

08
Compositions in C major
1776 compositions